The 1998 Georgia lieutenant gubernatorial election was held on November 3, 1998, to elect the lieutenant governor of Georgia, concurrently with the 1998 gubernatorial election, as well as elections to the United States Senate and elections to the United States House of Representatives and various state and local elections. Georgia is one of 21 states that elects its lieutenant governor separately from its governor.

Incumbent Democratic lieutenant governor Pierre Howard chose to not run for re-election in order to run for governor but later dropped out of the race. Mark Taylor defeated Republican nominee Mitch Skandalakis.

Democratic primary

Candidates

Advanced to runoff
 Mark Taylor, State Senator from Albany
 Mary Margaret Oliver, State Senator from Decatur

Defeated in primary
 Guy Middleton, State Senator from Dahlonega
 J. Mac Barber, Public Service Commissioner
 Floyd Griffin, State Senator from Milledgeville
 Nick Dodys

Results

Runoff Results

Republican primary

Candidates

Advanced to runoff
 Mitch Skandalakis, Fulton County Commissioner
 Clint Day, State Senator from Norcross

Defeated in primary
 Chuck Clay, State Senator from Marietta
 Randy Poynter
 Pam Glanton, State Senator from Riverdale

Results

Runoff Results

General election

Results

See also
1998 United States gubernatorial elections
1998 Georgia gubernatorial election
1998 United States Senate election in Georgia
1998 United States House of Representatives elections in Georgia
State of Georgia
Lieutenant Governors of Georgia

References

1998 Georgia (U.S. state) elections
Lieutenant Governors of Georgia (U.S. state)